(born 19 September 1993) is a Japanese professional footballer who plays as a defender for J1 League club Avispa Fukuoka.

Club career statistics
Updated to 5 November 2022.

1Includes Emperor's Cup.
2Includes J. League Cup.
3Includes Japanese Super Cup.

Honours

Club
J1 League (2) : 2017, 2018
Japanese Super Cup (1) : 2019

References

External links
Profile at Avispa Fukuoka

1993 births
Living people
Association football people from Hokkaido
Japanese footballers
Japan youth international footballers
J1 League players
J2 League players
J3 League players
Hokkaido Consadole Sapporo players
FC Tokyo players
Kawasaki Frontale players
J.League U-22 Selection players
Kashima Antlers players
Avispa Fukuoka players
Association football defenders
People from Kitami, Hokkaido